Dalegarden is a small village in Vaksdal municipality in Vestland county, Norway. It is located southwest of the municipal centre, Dale.  The village is considered to be part of the urban area of Dale which had an overall population of 1,193 (in 2019).

References

Villages in Vestland
Vaksdal